Čazma is a town in Bjelovar-Bilogora County, Croatia. It is part of Moslavina.

Geography

Čazma is situated 60 kilometers east of Zagreb and only 30 kilometres from the center of the region - Bjelovar. 
Čazma is situated on the slopes of Moslavačka gora, surrounded by fertile lowlands. The river Česma runs to the east of Čazma and the smaller river Glogovnica flows into it nearby, too.

History

The town of Čazma is one of the oldest towns in the Republic of Croatia. It was mentioned in 1094, when the Hungarian king Ladislav gave Čazma as a possession to the bishop of Zagreb. The year that is mentioned as the year of Čazma's foundation is 1226, when bishop Stjepan II Babonić established a parish, built a Dominican monastery and - today far known for its cultural worth, the Church of saint Mary Magdalene, which gave the parish its present name. The church is the only preserved monument of the earliest written eight hundred-year history of the city. It is a unique example of romanic architecture in northern Croatia and experts equate its value with the Zagreb cathedral. The church organ made in 1767 are one of the most beautiful in Croatia.

Janus Pannonius (Latin: Ioannes Pannonius, Croatian: Ivan Česmički, Hungarian: Csezmiczei János, or Kesencei; 29 August 1434 – 27 March 1472) was born here who was a Croat-Hungarian Latinist, poet, diplomat and Bishop of Pécs. He was the most significant poet of the Renaissance in the Kingdom of Hungary and one of the better-known figures of Humanist poetry in Europe.

The town was occupied by the Ottoman Turks in 1552, who established their sanjak there. The town stayed under Ottoman rule for 54 years until it was liberated by Croatian Ban Toma Bakač Erdedi and his army in 1606.

In the late 19th and early 20th century, Čazma was a district capital in the Bjelovar-Križevci County of the Kingdom of Croatia-Slavonia.

Economy

Its economy is based on small and middle-sized companies which manufacture final products from natural goods. Tradespeople, together with agricultural manufacturers, direct their development to services, production and tourist potential.

Half of the region where the town of Čazma is situated spreads out on agricultural land and as much as 44 percent is forested. Mineral wealth in the soil: quartz-sand, clay, stone etc., and especially springs of drinking water of great quality, enable various investments and building of plants, operation facilities and production lines.

The best known company from Čazma is Čazmatrans (transport company), which was established 1949.

Demographics

In 2021 the town proper had a population of 2,424. The municipality of 36 villages was inhabited by a total of 6,947 people.

 Andigola
 Bojana
 Bosiljevo
 Cerna
 Dapci
 Dereza
 Donji Draganec
 Donji Dragičevci
 Donji Miklouš
 Gornji Draganec
 Gornji Dragičevci
 Gornji Miklouš
 Grabik
 Grabovnica
 Komuševac
 Marčani
 Milaševac
 Novo Selo
 Općevac
 Palančani
 Pobjenik
 Pobrđani
 Prnjarovac
 Prokljuvani
 Sišćani
 Sovari
 Suhaja
 Vagovina
 Vrtlinska
 Vučani
 Zdenčec

According to the 2011 census, 98% of the population are Croats.

References

External links

 

Cities and towns in Croatia
Populated places in Bjelovar-Bilogora County
Bjelovar-Križevci County